The 2014 Stratford-on-Avon District Council election took place on 22 May 2014 to elect members of Stratford-on-Avon District Council in England. This was on the same day as other local elections.

References

2014 English local elections
2014
2010s in Warwickshire